Horod from Old Slavonic gord is a version of the Slavic word meaning "town", "city" or "castle", also found in Slavic languages as grad or gorod.

Horod is preserved in the toponymy of numerous Slavic placenames:

 Uzhhorod
 Vyshhorod
 Horodok
 Horodyshche
 Myrhorod
 Novomyrhorod
 Bilhorod-Dnistrovskyi
 Horodyshche
 Horodenka
 Sharhorod
 Bilohorodka
 Hradyzk, formerly Horodyshche
 Novhorod-Siverskyi
 Novhorodka
 Zvenyhorod
 Zvenyhorodka

Slavic toponyms